An arroyo (from Spanish arroyo , "brook"), also called a wash, is a dry creek, stream bed or gulch that temporarily or seasonally fills and flows after sufficient rain. Flash floods are common in arroyos following thunderstorms.

Wadi (Arabic) is used in North Africa and Western Asia for similar landforms. 

The desert dry wash biome is restricted to the arroyos of the southwestern United States. Arroyos provide a water source to desert animals.

Types and processes
Arroyos can be natural fluvial landforms or constructed flood control channels.  The term usually applies to a sloped or mountainous terrain in xeric and desert climates.  In addition: in many rural communities arroyos are also the principal transportation routes; and in many urban communities arroyos are also parks and recreational locations, often with linear multi-use bicycle, pedestrian, and equestrian trails. Flash flooding can cause the deep arroyos or deposition of sediment on flooded lands. This can lower the groundwater level of the surrounding area, making it unsuitable for agriculture. However a shallow water table lowered in desert arroyo valleys can reduce saline seeping and alkali deposits in the topsoil, making it suitable for irrigated farming.

Natural
Research has been conducted in the hydrological modeling relative to arroyos.
Natural arroyos are made through the process known as arroyo-cutting. This occurs in arid regions such as New Mexico, where heavy rains can lead to enlargement of rivers cutting into surrounding rock creating ravines which are dry under normal weather conditions.
It is argued, however, whether these excessively stormy periods are the sole cause of arroyo-cutting as other factors such as long-term climate changes must also be taken into account. Further, overgrazing by livestock throughout the 20th century and today has removed vast amounts of surface vegetation which decreases ground infiltration of precipitation and increased runoff, increasing speed and energy of high flow rain events. Coupled with groundwater pumping this increases downcutting in arroyos as well. Arroyo cutting which occurred in the 1900s in the southwestern United States caused serious farming issues such as a lowered water table and the destruction of agriculture lands.

Constructed
In agricultural areas in climates needing irrigation, farmers traditionally relied on small constructed arroyos, acequias, zanjas or aqueduct channels and ditches for the distribution of water.

An example of larger constructed arroyos is in Albuquerque, New Mexico. There are several miles of open-air concrete lined drainage channels that drain an area into the main North Diversion Channel, a tributary of the Rio Grande joining upstream of Albuquerque. After the San Juan Project Water Treatment Plant here, the Rio Grande's flow exceeding that needed for the river's silvery minnow habitat is available for municipal water supply diversion. Signs are posted at the constructed arroyos warning to keep out due to danger of flash flooding.
 
The Arroyo Seco and Los Angeles River are more famous examples in Southern California of former natural arroyo seasonal watercourses that became constructed open drainage system arroyos.

See also 
 Billabong
 Draw
 Wadi

Notes

External links

Fluvial landforms
Erosion landforms
Dry or seasonal streams
 
Canyons and gorges
Valleys